James Scott Wilkinson (born 4 December 1951) is an Australian former politician and sportsman, who was an independent member of the Tasmanian Legislative Council, representing the Division of Queenborough from 1995, then the Division of Nelson from 1999 when Queenborough was abolished. He was President of the Tasmanian Legislative Council from 2013, until his retirement from the council in May 2019.

As a child, Wilkinson lived in Battery Point and later Sandy Bay where he attended Hutchins School. Upon completing his studies, he moved to Melbourne to play for South Melbourne in the VFL between 1970 to 1972.

After 3 years in Melbourne, he then returned to Tasmania to study law, while also continuing with sport playing football and cricket for Sandy Bay.

As a result of his efforts he played first-class cricket for Tasmania from 1973 to 1975 as well as becoming the Australian junior and senior royal amateur tennis champion.

In 1977, he married his wife Jill and together they have four children and four grandchildren.

On completing his sporting career, he turned his focus to the ABC to commentate on both football and cricket. His commentating career in football lasted more than 15 years and expanded into a football program on 7HT on Saturday mornings with Noel Grey.

He later took a position with the Tasmanian Football Commission for a number of years, the last of which being the role of Chief Commissioner for Tasmania Australia National Football League. During this time he was also a member of the Tasmanian Cricket Association Board for many years and a representative on the Swimming Tasmania Board.

As well as his position on the Tasmanian Legislative Council his is also practising lawyer in Hobart, working as a consultant to Wallace Wilkinson & Webster, having been a partner of the firm prior to his appointment to the Legislative Council.

References

External links
 Official Jim Wilkinson Website
 
 Jim Wilkinson's inaugural speech to parliament
 
 Jim Wilkinson's Profile and Statistics on AustralianFootball.com

1951 births
Living people
Independent members of the Parliament of Tasmania
Members of the Tasmanian Legislative Council
Presidents of the Tasmanian Legislative Council
Tasmania cricketers
Sydney Swans players
Sandy Bay Football Club players
Australian cricketers
Australian rules footballers from Tasmania
Australian sportsperson-politicians
21st-century Australian politicians